Vitus of Kotor, also Vito and Vita (c. 1275 – after 1335) was an architect from Kotor who is known for the construction of the Visoki Dečani monastery.

Biography
He was born in Kotor, at the time part of the Kingdom of Serbia (now Montenegro) and studied construction in Kotor where he joined the Franciscan monastery and became a monk and a master-builder with his own workshop. His organizational skills and ability to gather the best craftsmen from surrounding regions, including Dubrovnik (at the time part of the Republic of Ragusa), earned him a reputation. He was personally commissioned by Serbian kings Stefan Milutin and Stefan Dečanski to build Visoki Dečani.

His full name is recorded variously by historians, Vito Trifunov (of Tryphon, referring to an ancestor) Čučola or possibly Čuča, Kotoranin (of Kotor). This is based on an inscription on the portal of the southern gate of Dečani, but only 20th century work by historians Risto Kovijanić and Ivo Stjepčević correlated the person to the records in Kotor.

The initial construction on Visoki Dečani Monastery occurred between 1327 and 1335 during the reign of Stefan Dečanski. The monastery is situated in the valley of the Bistrica river surrounded by the mountains and forests of the Prokletije mountain range in the disputed territory of Kosovo. Today's analysis of the sculpture and architecture of Dečani offers many clues to the authorship of sculptures of saints and a mausoleum in Banjska and series of churches in Kotor (including a basilica) of the 14th century that is attributable to Fra Vito from Kotor who built a similar mausoleum in Dečani.

Vitus is credited for the construction of the monastery church at Dečani which began in early 1327. The church was dedicated to Christ Pantocrator. King Stefan Dečanski commissioned the construction to a group of master-builders headed by master Vitus of Kotor and under the supervision of Archbishop, later Saint, Danilo II. In 1330, Stefan Dečanski granted a charter for the monastery with an endowment to support the monastery in perpetuity. Stefan's remains are preserved in the Dečani church in a coffin at the head of the altar.

Vitus of Kotor is also credited with Our Lady of Ljeviš, an early 14th-century Serbian Orthodox church in Prizren. Stefan Milutin, King of Serbia commissioned its rebuilding and expansion in 1306 on the site of a Byzantine basilica of the 11th century. The Byzantine church had three naves to which Milutin added two more. The architecture of the rebuilt church utilized Late Byzantine architecture through the use of five domes, monumental inscriptions in its exterior, narthex interior. and the Byzantine belfry. Milutin chose Vitus of Kotor as the master-builder of the complex and told him to utilize Byzantine elements. Another aspect of the frescoes of Bogorodica is their depiction of Orthodox councils as a symbol that referred to the challenges the Orthodox Church faced against the Roman Catholic Church, a situation common in the borderlands between Catholicism and Orthodoxy in the Balkans.

Our Lady of Ljeviš was the official name in Milutin's period although the church was popularly known as the Church of Saint Petka. After the Turkish conquest, it was turned into a mosque and the name was changed to Fatih Cami or Mehmed Fatih's mosque. It is now under the protection of UNESCO.

He died in Kotor.

References

Further reading
 

1275 births
1330s deaths
People from Kotor
Franciscans
People of the Kingdom of Serbia (medieval)
Medieval architects